Championships is the fourth studio album by American rapper Meek Mill. It was released on November 30, 2018, by Atlantic Records and Maybach Music Group. The album features guest appearances from Fabolous, Anuel AA, Cardi B, Rick Ross, Jay-Z, Future, Roddy Ricch, Young Thug, Drake, Kodak Black, Ella Mai, 21 Savage, Melii, Jeremih, and PnB Rock. Meanwhile, production was handled by Bangladesh, Cardo, Cubeatz, C-Sick, Don Cannon, Hit-Boy, Hitmaka, Prince Chrishan, Tay Keith, and Wheezy, among others. The lead single from the album, "Going Bad" featuring Drake was released on January 22, 2019.

Championships received positive reviews from critics and debuted atop the US Billboard 200, selling 229,000 album-equivalent units in its first week.

Background
On July 21, 2017, Meek Mill released his third studio album, Wins & Losses. On November 6, Meek Mill was sentenced to two to four years in state prison for violating parole and served five months at the State Correctional Institution – Chester in Chester, Pennsylvania. On April 24, 2018, Mill was released pending the outcome of the appeal to the Pennsylvania supreme court. The Philadelphia district attorney had petitioned Judge Brinkley for his release, citing credibility issues with the arresting officer in his initial 2008 conviction. Brinkley had declined and instead scheduled the case for a hearing. Hours after his release from prison, Michael G. Rubin, a minority owner of the Philadelphia 76ers and long-time supporter of Mill, flew Mill in by helicopter to a 76ers basketball game to perform a ceremonial bell-ringing on the court before the start of the game. Garnering support from other public figures such as Jay-Z and Kevin Hart, Mill stated that he would like to use his situation to "shine a light" on the criminal justice system.

On July 6, 2018, Mill released his first new music since his release from prison with a release of his fifth extended play, titled Legends of the Summer. On September 28, Mill announced that he would be releasing an album "real soon, like in a matter of weeks." On November 8, during a conversation regarding criminal justice reform at Georgetown University, Mill announced that the album would be released in November. The album was reported to include songs about Mill's "experiences and issues with social justice" following his release from prison earlier in 2018.

Release and promotion
On November 14, 2018, Meek Mill appeared in a Vogue interview, playing a portion of his collaboration with rapper Cardi B and revealing the album would be released on November 30, 2018. He later announced the album's title, release date and cover art on social media on November 16, 2018. The cover art, a close-up shot of Meek Mill's face, was called "minimalist". The tracklist was revealed on November 29, 2018.

Singles
On November 22, 2018, "Oodles o' Noodles Babies" and "Uptown Vibes" featuring Fabolous and Anuel AA were released as promotional singles. Meek Mill performed "Oodles o' Noodles Babies" on The Tonight Show Starring Jimmy Fallon the same day. The lead single from the album, "Going Bad" featuring Drake was released to urban contemporary radio on January 22, 2019.

Other songs
The music video for the song, "Intro", was released on December 10, 2018. The music video for "Trauma" was released on December 19, 2018.

Critical reception

Championships received generally positive reviews from critics. At Metacritic, which assigns a normalized rating out of 100 to reviews from mainstream publications, the album received an average score of 77, based on 10 reviews, indicating "generally favorable reviews". Writing for Billboard, Sowmya Krishnamurthy stated, "Meek raps with the same fervor he's always had, but there's a discernable focus on Championships. He's bridled his high-octane flow and is more clear-eyed. Incarceration has sparked a new purpose in him, as an activist and also as a man coming into his own." She also opined the reunion of Mill and Drake in "Going Bad" "is a high point" of the album, while "On Me," "features Cardi B stealing the show in perhaps her most confident rapping to date." Evan Rytlewski of Pitchfork gave the album a 7.7 out of 10 saying, "Despite being born of injustice, an air of victory hangs over Meek's first full-length since he was released from prison. It captures an intensity that the Philadelphia rapper is known for and best at."

Writing for Clash, Aaron Bishop called the album Meek's best to date saying, "On Championships, his fourth studio album, Meek Mill raps with the same hunger, passion and drive that he came into the game with - which earned him veteran status at MMG as Rick Ross’s right hand lieutenant - but now with a renewed sense of purpose and direction." In a positive review for Exclaim!, Erin Lowers praised the album stating, "As much as Championships is filled with nonchalant club/street anthems, it's also about healing. Tempered by both celebration and struggle, Championships shows the duality of Mill's world--one that still reflects on the past, but has made leaps towards his future--and that's perhaps the greatest win of them all."

Commercial performance
Championships debuted at number one on the US Billboard 200 chart with 229,000 album-equivalent units, of which 42,000 came from pure album sales in its first week. It became his second number-one album, and logged the fourth-largest streaming week of 2018 for an album. In its second week, the album fell to number two on the chart, moving another 129,000 equivalent units that week. In its third week, the album remained at number two on the chart, moving another 83,000 album-equivalent units that week. In its fourth week, the album dropped to number six on the chart, moving another 54,000 units that week. On June 5, 2019, the album was certified platinum by the Recording Industry Association of America (RIAA) for combined sales and album-equivalent units of over a million units in the United States.

Track listing
Credits adapted from Tidal and Spotify.

Notes
  signifies a co-producer
  signifies an additional producer
  signifies an uncredited co-producer

Sample credits
 "Intro" contains a sample of "In the Air Tonight", written by Phil Collins and Hugh Padgham, and performed by Phil Collins.
 "Trauma" contains a sample of "Get Away", written by Albert Johnson and Kejuan Muchita, and performed by Mobb Deep; and a sample of "Taking Me Higher", written by Les Holroyd, and performed by Barclay James Harvest.
 "What's Free" contains a sample of "What's Beef?", written by Christopher Wallace, Nashiem Myrick, and Carlos Broady, and performed by The Notorious B.I.G.; and a sample of "Close to You", written and performed by Richard Evans.
 "Respect the Game" contains a sample of "A Garden of Peace", written and performed by Lonnie Liston Smith.
 "Championships" contains a sample of "I Found the Girl", written and performed by Toney Fountaine.
 "24/7" contains samples of "Me, Myself and I", written by Beyoncé Knowles, Scott Storch, and Robert Waller, and performed by Beyoncé.
 "Oodles o' Noodles Babies" contains a sample of "Love Changes", written by Skip Scarborough, and performed by Mother's Finest.
 "Stuck In My Ways" contains a sample from "Welcome To Creepshow", written and performed by John Harrison.
 "Cold Hearted II" contains a sample from "I Was Never There", written by Abel Tesfaye, Mike Lévy and Adam Feeney, and performed by The Weeknd; and an interpolation of "We Don't Give a Fuck", written by Earl Simmons, Jason Phillips, David Styles and Irving Lorenzo, Jr., and performed by DMX featuring Jadakiss and Styles P.

Personnel
Credits adapted from Tidal.

Instrumentation
 Chris Payton – guitar 
 Quintin Gulledge – organ 
 Rance Dopson – organ , keyboards , strings 
 Vinny Venditto – keyboards 
 Dammo Farmer – bass 
 Khirye Taylor – keyboards , organ , strings 

Technical
 Anthony Cruz – recording 
 Dylan Del Olmo – recording 
 Evan LaRay Brunson – recording 
 Mac Attkisson – additional recording 
 Gimel "Young Guru" Keaton – mixing 
 Jaycen Joshua – mixing 
 Colin Leonard – mastering 
 Dave Kutch – mastering 
 Alex Estevez – engineer 
 Lou Carrao – engineer 
 Steven Xia – engineer , recording 
 James "Jayme Be" Belt – engineer 
 William "Bilz" Dougan – engineer 
 Douglas "Voli" Martung – engineer , additional arrangement , editor 
 Jacob Richards – engineer 
 Mike Seaberg – engineer 
 Rashawn McLean – engineer

Charts

Weekly charts

Year-end charts

Decade-end charts

Certifications

References

2018 albums
Meek Mill albums
Albums produced by Bangladesh (record producer)
Albums produced by C-Sick
Albums produced by Cardo
Albums produced by Cubeatz
Albums produced by Don Cannon
Albums produced by Hit-Boy
Albums produced by Tay Keith
Atlantic Records albums
Maybach Music Group albums
Albums produced by Wheezy